State of South Carolina v. Richard Alexander Murdaugh was the trial of American former lawyer Alex Murdaugh for the murder of his wife, Maggie, and their 22-year-old son, Paul, on June 7, 2021. The trial in the fourteenth circuit of the South Carolina Circuit Court began on January 25, 2023, and ended on March 2 with a guilty verdict on all four counts. Murdaugh, who had pleaded not guilty, was sentenced to two life sentences to run consecutively without the possibility of parole. Murdaugh's attorneys have filed a notice of appeal.

Local media called the trial South Carolina's "trial of the century" and "arguably one of the most high-profile and sensational cases in South Carolina legal history".

Background, murders, and investigation 

Alex was a member of the Murdaugh family, a locally-prominent family of attorneys. During this time, Maggie had consulted a divorce lawyer in Charleston to discuss ending her marriage.  Paul Murdaugh had been under indictment and facing trial for the wrongful death of Mallory Beach.

Murders
Alex called Maggie on June 7, 2021 to meet him at the Murdaugh family lodge. He wanted the two of them to travel together from there to see his father, Randolph Murdaugh III, who was terminally ill. Maggie texted a friend, saying Alex sounded "fishy" and was "up to something". After parking her car at the house, she walked to the dog kennels, where she found her son Paul. Alex called police from his cell phone at 10:06 p.m., saying he had discovered the bodies of his wife, Maggie (52), and their younger son, Paul (22), near the dog kennels at the family's hunting lodge, in Islandton, South Carolina. Each had been shot multiple times (in the head, wrists, and chest), with different guns. Murdaugh claimed that at the time of the killings he had been with his mother, who has dementia; however, cellphone data, including video containing Alex's voice, placed him at the scene before their deaths.

Investigation
In October 2021, it was revealed that South Carolina Law Enforcement Division (SLED) had regarded Alex as a person of interest in the homicides since the start of the investigation. The investigation was heavily criticized by Murdaugh's defense attorney, Dick Harpootlian, during trial. The crime scene was spoiled by rain, the police reportedly failed to collect various evidence, and allowed family members and friends to walk through the scene.

Indictment and arrest 
Murdaugh was arrested in July 2022 after the Colleton County Grand Jury issued an indictment charging him with two counts of murder and two counts of possession of a weapon during the commission of a violent crime in the deaths of his wife, Maggie, and of his son Paul. The indictment stated that Alex shot his wife with a rifle and his son with a shotgun.  Murdaugh pleaded not guilty; prosecutors said they would seek life imprisonment without the possibility of parole, not the death penalty.

Trial 

Murdaugh's trial began January 25, 2023, at the Colleton County Courthouse in Walterboro, South Carolina, with instructions from the judge and opening statements from the prosecution and defense.
Murdaugh was represented by Dick Harpootlian and Jim Griffin. The cases were overseen by Clifton Newman. Creighton Waters, chief prosecutor for the state grand jury, led the prosecuting team against Murdaugh. John Meadors, a Columbia attorney with extensive experience in murder trials, was hired by the Attorney General of South Carolina as part of the prosecuting team. 

Defense counsel argued that the prosecution should be prohibited from asking questions related to Murdaugh's financial crimes but the judge overruled their objections and announced he would make a formal ruling on the matter on Thursday, February 2, 2023. The judge dismissed the jury early on Thursday, February 2, in order for the prosecution to present two witnesses who testified in chambers about Murdaugh's financial crimes. The judge said that he needed to hear more testimony privately before ruling whether these witnesses would be allowed to testify before the jury.

On February 7,  after several days of hearing arguments without the jury present, Judge Newman ruled that the testimony related to Murdaugh's alleged financial crimes was admissible: he said that jurors were entitled to consider whether Murdaugh's financial situation was a motive for the killings. Newman also said that defense counsel had opened the door to testimony about the alleged financial crimes when they asked a witness to speculate about a possible motive for Murdaugh to commit the murders. A bomb threat on February 8 forced the court to recess for several hours.

On February 13, Judge Newman announced that two jurors had been dismissed and replaced with alternate jurors because they had tested positive for COVID-19. On February 24, a new charge was filed against Murdaugh for passing contraband in the courtroom.  At the defense's request, the jury visited the murder scene. Closing arguments began on March 1. On March 2, Judge Newman announced that he had been notified that a juror had discussed the evidence presented. The juror was dismissed for improper conduct and an alternate replaced her. Attorney Creighton Waters delivered the state's closing statement, and attorney Jim Griffin delivered the defense's closing statement. Attorney John Meadors delivered the state's reply and final argument. The jury was charged and began deliberating on March 2.

Testimony 

The first prosecution witnesses included first responders on the scene after Murdaugh's 911 call. The prosecution asked the judge to compel a representative of Snapchat to testify about a video posted by Paul Murdaugh minutes before his death. The prosecution brought SLED witnesses to testify about firearms and ballistics, and an interview conducted with Murdaugh in a car on June 21, 2021, during which Murdaugh said of his son, "It's just so bad. I did him so bad," which Waters emphasized for the jury. The defense team disputed whether the recording said "I" or "they". The prosecution brought an expert witness to testify about data collected by Maggie's phone. The prosecution brought two close friends of Paul Murdaugh to testify about their interactions with the Murdaugh family and their communications with Paul moments before his death.  A witness said he heard Alex's voice in a video taken by Paul minutes before the time the prosecution believes the murders took place.

Prosecutors called former colleagues and clients of Murdaugh to testify about the defendant's financial situation just before the murders occurred, and argued that the motive was stress caused by the impending discovery of Murdaugh's financial crimes. They also called a chief executive officer of a local bank to testify about the bank's discovery of theft by Murdaugh.

Prosecutors called expert witnesses, including a criminologist and pathologist. They called a SLED agent to testify about a timeline for the events of June 7, aggregating all of the data collected from various sources, including the cell-phones of the victims and the defendant, car telemetry data, and cell-phone tower pings. Prosecutors rested their case on February 17.

Defense counsel called their first witness immediately after the prosecution rested their case. They called the Colleton County coroner, who testified that he had only estimated the victims' body temperatures and that the reported time of death was an estimate.

On February 21, the defense called the defendant's other son, Buster, to the stand. The defense called several expert witnesses, including a crime-scene engineer, who re-created the crime scene and argued that the presumed height of the shooter was not consistent with the defendant's height. Another expert witness testified that he believed the crime scene was not handled properly by first responders.

On February 23, Murdaugh took the stand to testify. He denied shooting his wife and son. Murdaugh confirmed that he could be heard in a video taken by his son at 8:44 p.m. at the kennels. Murdaugh admitted repeatedly lying to law officers about whether he had been at the kennels at the night of the killings (before he reported finding the bodies there later that night), and attributed the lies to "paranoid thinking" from his addiction to opioids. He also admitted stealing from legal clients and his firm, and also admitted asking a relative to shoot him. The prosecution's  cross-examination began the same day. Murdaugh finished his testimony the next day, and Judge Newman dismissed the jury immediately after it concluded.

The defense called a pathologist, who testified that the state's pathologist had not correctly determined the entrance and exit wounds on Paul's body. The defense also called Tim Palmbach, an expert in bloodstain spatter analysis. Palmbach has also testified in such high-profile cases as the trial of Michael Peterson. Palmbach testified that he believed that a shooter would have been covered in blood and gunshot residue; he also stated that he believed that the evidence was consistent with two shooters' being present. The last witness the defense called was the defendant's brother, John Marvin Murdaugh. On February 27, the defense rested their case and moved for a directed verdict, which was subsequently denied by Judge Newman.

After the defense rested their case, the prosecution indicated they would reply to the defense's case. On February 28, the prosecution began their reply case by calling witnesses. Four of the witnesses they called had testified earlier. A police chief who had associated with Murdaugh was also called to the stand. The final witness was a crime-scene expert called previously; South Carolina Attorney General Alan Wilson conducted the direct examination.  The prosecution rested their reply case on February 28.

Verdict and sentencing 

On March 2, 2023, after three hours' deliberation, the jury found Murdaugh guilty of two counts of murder and two counts of possession of a weapon during a violent crime. Because of the intense public interest in the case, the verdict was transmitted live across the United States on major broadcast and cable news networks. After the verdict was read, judge Newman denied a motion from the defense for a mistrial by saying "The evidence of guilt is overwhelming." He told the jurors "The circumstantial evidence, direct evidence—all of the evidence pointed to one conclusion, and that’s the conclusion that you all reached." Newman later added that the jury had come to a "proper conclusion as they saw the law and facts". Murdaugh was sentenced to two consecutive life sentences without the possibility of parole on March 3, 2023, at 10:08 a.m. EST. After his sentencing, Murdaugh was taken to the Kirkland Correctional Institution, in northwestern Columbia, South Carolina, where he was to be evaluated for about 45 days to determine which maximum-security prison he would be sent to.

Aftermath 

After the verdict, prosecutors held a press conference. The defense took questions from media the day after sentencing and said that they would appeal the verdict.  Defense attorney Jim Griffin said the Murdaugh family was "steadfastly in Alex's camp". In an interview, Murdaugh's older brother, Randy, said he believed that his brother had not told the whole truth about what he knew about the killings.

On March  9, Murdaugh's attorneys filed a notice of appeal with the South Carolina Court of Appeals.

Media portrayals 
News media called the trial South Carolina's "trial of the century" and "arguably one of the most high-profile and sensational cases in South Carolina legal history".

There have been TV episodes, podcasts, and documentaries about the case. Some notable examples:
 Murdaugh Murders podcast (2021; Liz Farrell & Mandy Matney)
 Low Country: The Murdaugh Dynasty (2022; Campfire Studios / HBO Max)
 Murdaugh Murders: Deadly Dynasty (2022; Investigation Discovery)
 Murdaugh Murders: A Southern Scandal (2023; Netflix)

References 

2023 in South Carolina
January 2023 events in the United States
February 2023 events in the United States
March 2023 events in the United States
Murder trials
Murder in South Carolina
21st-century American trials
Familicides
Murdaugh family